Brian Gross (born 1976 in Cedar Rapids, Iowa) is an actor starring in the 1998 TV series Wind on Water as Kelly Connolly and has also appeared in numerous films and TV movies.

Gross portrays Captain James T. Kirk from episode 9 in the fan-created series Star Trek: Phase II.

Personal
Gross graduated from his high school in Iowa in 1995. He then went on to obtain his degree in International Business from Loyola Marymount University.  He is also an outspoken advocate of gay rights.

Film 
Girlfriend Killer (Lifetime movie) as Ryan (2017)
Knifepoint (2011)
Stem Cell (2009)
Big Momma's House 2 (2006)
2001 Maniacs (2005)
Jack Frost 2: Revenge of the Mutant Killer Snowman (2002)
Sorority Boys (2002)
Tiger Heart (1996)

Television 
Saving Grace
NCIS
NCIS: Los Angeles
CSI: NY
CSI: Miami
Walker, Texas Ranger
Touched by an Angel
Psych
Las Vegas
2 Broke Girls
Cold Case
Joey
Bones
Pacific Blue
JAG
Sabrina the Teenage Witch
Buffy the Vampire Slayer 
Baywatch
Hope Ranch

External links 

American male television actors
Living people
Place of birth missing (living people)
1976 births